The Nation Alliance, or simply Nation, is an electoral and political alliance in Turkey, made up of six opposition parties to contest the 2023 Turkish general election against its main rival, the People's Alliance. Originally established prior to the country's 2018 general election, the alliance had consisted of four opposition parties across the political spectrum, which had found common ground on withstanding Turkey's newly established presidential system. 

Although Nation had become rather inactive as a bloc following their defeat in 2018; the Republican People's Party (CHP) and the Good Party (İYİ) restored the alliance for the upcoming 2019 local elections, which delivered the opposition their first major electoral success in years. 

The alliance has since enlarged, welcoming two breakaway parties from the ruling Justice and Development Party (AKP); namely the Future Party (GP) and Democracy and Progress Party (DEVA), both of which had already announced their intention to nominate a joint candidate along with the parties of the Nation. Shortly after the enlargement, Nation Alliance announced its prospective government platform, becoming the first political entity in Turkey to do so prior to an election. 

Generally, the platform puts a particular emphasis on establishing a strengthened parliamentary system; reversing the current trend of democratic backsliding, reinstating rule of law and separation of powers, as well as improving Turkey's human rights record.

Current format of the Nation Alliance features stark differences in comparison with 2018, back when all parties had nominated their individual candidates for the presidency, and the alliance had more of an electoral focus than a political one, interconnecting parties with vaguely defined precepts. In contrast with the past, the parties now strive to act with consensus; laying the groundwork of a potential democratic transition in post-Erdoğan Turkey.

History and background

2017 constitutional referendum
A constitutional referendum was to be held in April 2017, regarding the complete transformation of the political system of Turkey from a parliamentary one, into a presidential one. The referendum was campaigned and sponsored by the ruling Justice and Development Party (AKP), the smaller oppositional Nationalist Movement Party (MHP), who would later become in complete support of the AKP government following the referendum, and some more pro-government groups and media.

The constitutional referendum ultimately passed with a narrow margin of 2-3% on an 85% voter turnout, effectively triggering the country's systemic transition. Meanwhile, the main opposition Republican People's Party (CHP), along with MHP now-dissidents such as Meral Akşener who would go onto establish the Good Party (İYİ), voiced strong opposition to the constitutional amendments which were deemed undemocratic, autocratic and seen as a threat to rule of law, democracy and separation of powers within the country.

The alliance had brought together many groups with differing ideologies that had campaigned for a "No" vote against the transition into a presidential system during the referendum, and those who were already in opposition to the government of President Recep Tayyip Erdoğan under a common and unifying banner. As a result; the alliance's supportive bases were viewed as being spread out across many differing political views and ideologies, though unifying under an opposition to Erdoğan and support of a strengthened parliamentary system.

2018 elections and 2019 local election 
When the new AKP-MHP government legalized the formation of pre-election alliances in order to contest the 2018 elections together, which was previously limited, speculation arose over the possibility of opposition groups also establishing an alliance. After several sets of talks, the CHP announced on 1 May 2018 the formation of its alliance with Akşener's new Good Party, as well as with the extraparliamentary Felicity and Democrat parties. In order for the Good Party to compete in the election more effectively the CHP transferred 15 of its MPs to the new party so it could have a parliamentary group. Smaller transfers took place with the other two parties within the alliance, again as political support before the 2018 elections took place.

During the 2018 elections, these constituent parties of the alliance contested under a common banner for the parliamentary election, while for the presidential election each individual party nominated its own candidate, though the parties stated beforehand that they would support the leading opposition presidential candidate; Muharrem İnce, if the 2018 presidential election was proponed for a head-to-head second round.

On 4 July, following the alliance winning 189 seats out of the 600 seats in the Grand National Assembly, the Good Party General Secretary Aytun Çıray announced that the Nation Alliance at that point had been partially dissolved, citing the lack of a need for a post-election alliance. In response, the CHP's spokesperson Bülent Tezcan expressed that the electoral alliance was no longer technically necessary, but that the unity of the member alliance parties under and in-supporting of a joint set of democratic fundamental values such as separation of powers, parliamentarianism, rule of law and human rights within Turkey were necessary and as such would continue.

Though, during the 2019 local elections the alliance came together once again with prominence and achieved overwhelming success, such as winning 6 out of the 7 largest mayoral municipalities, one being İstanbul whom had been under the rule of conservative parties for over 20 years, just also as capitol Ankara.

After these results, the electoral alliance this time took a less-temporary lasting stance as an electoral alliance, instead being a big tent political alliance, aiming to unify the dissident Turkish population until the future 2023-24 elections and possibly establish ground for a coalition government in the future.

Present
The alliance today holds a large portion of support across Turkey, as it covers the significant majority of the oppositional voters within the country, with the big-tent approach by the alliance also helping it gain support from more religious and socio-conservative groups within the country. The alliance expanding its big-tent approach by having the Islamist Felicity Party as a member, and approaching the AKP-splinters DEVA and Future parties, as well as the pro-Kurdish People's Democratic Party (HDP). These developments has seen the alliance gain prominence over the past 2 years, being seen as a way for the alliance to open up to voters such as religious voters, undecided Kurds and ex-AKP/MHP voters.

Most opinion polls and electoral projections which took place between mid-2021 and 2022 indicated that the alliance will become the dominant political force within the public in the country, and possibly the next majority-government of the country in the upcoming 2023 elections.

The Table of Six

As part of their ongoing 6-party joint collaborative meetings under the name of the “Table of Six” with alliance members İYİ, CHP, SP, DP, but also together with none-members such as the Democracy and Progress Party (DEVA) and Future Party (GP); the group is working on a newly proposed "enhanced and strengthened" parliamentary system modeled after other parliamentary European democracies, being deemed more democratic and stable from the previous parliamentary system of Turkey, including a new constitution guaranteeing the mentioned fundamentals and beyond.

The table is also expected to decide on the alliance's (and possibly all oppositions’) joint candidate for the 2023 presidential election under joint-support, arising speculations that the DEVA and Future parties may join the alliance during this electoral period.

On 3 March 2023, İYİ leader Meral Akşener announced that she took the decision to withdraw from the Table of Six and the Nation Alliance, and said her party would not support main opposition CHP leader Kemal Kılıçdaroğlu as the joint candidate in the 2023 Turkish presidential election. However on 6 March, she and her party rejoined the Table of Six after intense public criticism and after it was announced that Ekrem İmamoğlu and Mansur Yavaş would be appointed Vice-Presidents if Kılıçdaroğlu wins the presidential election.

Goals and views

The goal of both the alliance and six-party group is to transform Turkey's presidential system back into a newly modeled parliamentary system, and establish a new constitution that guarantees the fundamental; separation of powers, rule of law, democracy and human rights such as freedom of speech within the country, which all are considered to have been under significant suppression ever since the AKP took came to power in 2003. The parties within the alliance and table all have separate manifestos, economic recovery plans, proposed projects and diplomatic approaches, though still generally work collaboratively on issues regarding most of these fields.

Stance on the European Union & accession
The alliance and the table overwhelmingly stands in-favor of greater European integration and EU membership in a whole, thus also aiming to establish and set the required legal-basis and political grounds for compliance as such with the Copenhagen criteria for Turkey's accession into the European union-partnership. Turkey's candidate status, and accession process has been halted since 2018.

Stance on NATO
Although the alliance and table supports Turkey's position within NATO, and pushes for greater cooperation with other member states politically, economically and militarily, it also supports the country's mediating and belligerent stance in the Ukrainian-Russian war, and believes that Turkey should be reintegrated into the F-35 program while making use of the defensive weapons (such as the S-400) bought from and provided by Russia. The parties occasionally criticize the support of some allied NATO member-states for the PKK, YPG and other armed militant groups in-conflict with the country that are based in the Middle East, even though the PKK is officially and legally designated as terrorist groups by both the EU and NATO.

Membership

Members and political affiliations

Support during the 2018–2019 elections
In 2018, the presidential candidate of the alliance's largest party CHP, Muharrem İnce, was supported by minor parties such as the national-conservative Homeland Party (YP), liberal ANAP (Motherland) alongside the feminist KP (Women's Party) and 8 more minor parties, while Meral Akşener's candidacy was supported by that of the DSP and DYP.

The 3rd largest opposition party, pro-Kurdish People's Democratic Party (HDP) supported the Nation Alliance in many provinces during the 2019 local elections, most significantly during re-run of the Istanbul local election, though took it a generally neutral stance for the elections throughout this period. The party collaborated with the Nation Alliance's mayoral candidates in many cities, but still put out many of its own candidates in other parts of country. The HDP would go on to form its own electoral alliance with other left-wing parties in mid-2022; the Labour and Freedom Alliance. The HDP also stated that they would support the Nation Alliance's joint candidate even in the first round of the 2023 presidential election, if “their presidential candidate’s profile fits into those political standards of the HDP voter.”.

On 18 May 2021, the Democratic Left Party (DSP) also stated that they would fully support and stand with the Nation Alliance, though not seek membership.

Electoral history

General-parliamentary elections

Local elections

Notes

References

Political party alliances in Turkey
Political parties in Turkey
2018 disestablishments in Turkey
2018 establishments in Turkey
Political parties established in 2018
Democrat Party (Turkey, current)
Republican People's Party (Turkey)
2023 Turkish presidential election
2023 Turkish general election